Mironice   is a village in the administrative district of Gmina Kłodawa, within Gorzów County, Lubusz Voivodeship, in western Poland.

The village has a population of 80.

References

Mironice